In the early stages of the First World War, Serbia suffered an epidemic of typhus and relapsing fever. The epidemic first appeared in the late autumn of 1914, after the second Austrian offensive. By December the Austro-Hungarian troops were pushed out of Serbia for the second time in ten days. Around 50,000 wounded and sick remained in hospitals. Great problems with the lack of accommodation and food were affecting not only hospitals but the civilian population as well, besides that, there were around 50,000 Austro-Hungarian prisoners that had to be accommodated and fed too. Dr. Roman Sondermajer established a large field hospital near Kragujevac, using army barracks to care for the sick and wounded.

Flora Sandes, who started as a volunteer British nurse, recalled the conditions at the hospital in Kragujevac and meeting Dr. Sondermajer for the first time:

A contingent of Scottish nurses and physicians served in the fight against the epidemic, with many, including Margaret Neill Fraser, Louisa Jordan, and Elizabeth Ross, dying of typhus.

British Military Sanitary Committee to Serbia 
In 1915, the British military doctor William Hunter headed the British Military Sanitary Committee to Serbia tasked with stopping the epidemic. The epidemic was stopped by June 1915 by introduction of several movement restriction measures and by introduction of two new disinfection methods, the "railway van disinfector", and the "barrel disinfector" now known as the Serbian barrel.

In 1920, Hunter published a detailed account on the epidemic in the Proceedings of the Royal Society of Medicine.

References 

1915 health disasters
1915 in Serbia
20th-century epidemics
Epidemic typhus
Disease outbreaks in Serbia